Talking backwards may refer to:

Phonetic reversal, the art of reversing the phonemes or phones of a word or phrase
Ingressive speech, the process of talking while inhaling rather than exhaling
"Talking Backwards", a 2014 song by Real Estate